Occupational medicine, until 1960 called industrial medicine, is the branch of medicine which is concerned with the maintenance of health in the workplace, including prevention and treatment of diseases and injuries, with secondary objectives of maintaining and increasing productivity and social adjustment in the workplace.

Therefore, the branch of clinical medicine active in the field of occupational health and safety. OM specialists work to ensure that the highest standards of occupational health and safety are achieved and maintained in the workplace. While OM may involve a wide number of disciplines, it centers on preventive medicine and the management of illness, injury, and disability related to the workplace. Occupational physicians must have a broad knowledge of clinical medicine and be competent in some important fields. They often advise international bodies, governmental and state agencies, organizations, and trade unions. There are contextual links to physical medicine and rehabilitation and to insurance medicine. In recent times, as the burden of disease from psychosocial occupational risk factors is increasingly being recognized and quantified, occupational medicine is increasingly also focusing on addressing these occupational hazards.

Mission
Occupational medicine aims to prevent diseases and promote wellness among workers. Occupational health physicians must:
 Have knowledge of potential hazards in the workplace including toxic properties of materials used.
 Be able to evaluate employee fitness for work.
 Be able to diagnose and treat occupational disease and injury.
 Know about rehabilitation methods, health education, and government laws and regulations concerning workplace health.
 Be able to manage health service delivery.

OM can be described as:

work that combines clinical medicine, research, and advocacy for people who need the assistance of health professionals to obtain some measure of justice and health care for illnesses they suffer as a result of companies pursuing the biggest profits they can make, no matter what the effect on workers or the communities they operate in.

History
The first textbook of occupational medicine, De Morbis Artificum Diatriba (Diseases of Workers), was written by Italian physician Bernardino Ramazzini in 1700.

Governmental bodies

United States
National Institute for Occupational Safety and Health (NIOSH)
Occupational Safety and Health Administration (OSHA)

Russian Federation
Research Institute of Occupational Medicine of the Russian Academy of Sciences (Moscow)

Non-governmental organizations

International
International Commission on Occupational Health (ICOH)
Institute of Occupational Medicine (IOM)

Canadian
Occupational Medicine Specialists of Canada

United Kingdom
 Faculty of Occupational Medicine

United States
 American College of Occupational and Environmental Medicine (ACOEM)
American Osteopathic College of Occupational & Preventive Medicine (AOCOPM)

Europe
 European Society for Environmental and Occupational Medicine (EOM)
Australasia

 ANZSOM Australia https://www.anzsom.org.au/

 ANZSOM New Zealand https://anzsom.org.nz/

See also

 American Board of Preventive Medicine
 American Osteopathic Board of Preventive Medicine
 Industrial and organizational psychology
National Occupational Research Agenda
 Occupational disease
 Occupational Health and Safety
 Occupational health nursing
 Occupational health psychology
 Occupational Health Science (journal)
 Occupational hygiene
 Occupational Medicine (journal)
 Trauma und Berufskrankheit

References

Occupational safety and health
Occupational diseases
Medical specialties